Vinod Sundar Panthi is an Indian politician, social worker and former Member of legislative assembly for Bina constituency of Madhya Pradesh and she won the election in 2008 as a member of Bhartiya Janta Party of Madhya Pradesh. She belong to the Koli caste of Madhya Pradesh.

References

External links 
 Vinod Panthi, MLA

Living people
Koli people
Madhya Pradesh MLAs 2008–2013
Bharatiya Janata Party politicians from Madhya Pradesh
People from Sagar district
Women members of the Madhya Pradesh Legislative Assembly
1966 births
21st-century Indian women politicians